North Ward School, also known as the Bolivar High School and Polk County North Ward Museum, is a historic school building located at Bolivar, Polk County, Missouri.  It was designed by architect Henry H. Hohenschild and built in 1903. It was listed on the National Register of Historic Places in 2011.

Background
It is a two-story, "T"-shaped, brick building with a central, four-story entrance tower flanked by slightly projecting classroom wings.  It sits on a limestone block foundation and has a hipped roof.  It features round arched and segmental arched windows.  The building houses a local history museum.

References

History museums in Missouri
School buildings on the National Register of Historic Places in Missouri
School buildings completed in 1903
Buildings and structures in Polk County, Missouri
National Register of Historic Places in Polk County, Missouri
1903 establishments in Missouri